Kathi Kappal is a 2008 Tamil language thriller film written and directed by Dinesh Selvaraj. The film stars Anoop Kumar, Meera Vasudevan and Poornitha, with Chandrabose, Thalaivasal Vijay, Prem, Thennavan, Jayaprakasam, Sakthivel and Vinoth Kumar playing supporting roles. The film, produced by V. Bhakta, was released on 25 July 2008.

Plot

Set in 1988, the notorious forest brigand Veeraiyyan abducted a former minister and held him captive in the forest of Kodaikanal. To release him, Veeraiyyan demanded a ransom of 3 crores. Police Commissioner Chandrabose (Chandrabose) and his squad - Thennavan (Thennavan), Jayaprakash (Jayaprakasam), Sakthivel (Sakthivel), and Vinoth Kumar (Vinoth Kumar) - killed Veeraiyyan, but they could not save the minister, and in the process, the respected doctor Pari Vallal (Prem) was shot dead. Pari Vallal worked in a remote village to exercise his profession. He met the orphan Sara (Meera Vasudevan), who grew up in a church and decided to assist him. They fell in love with each other and got married.

In 2008, during the annual death ceremony of Pari Vallal in Kodaikanal, an injured Joshua Prakash (Anoop Kumar) appears and proclaims to be the Pari Vallal in his previous birth. Sara, Pari Vallal's widow who now lives with her adopted daughter Kabini (Baby Prahasitha), is astonished and could not believe it. The inhabitants, who think it was a practical joke, beat Joshua Prakash up and tie him with a rope to control him. The next day, Mallika (Poornitha) comes to the village and claims to be Joshua Prakash's wife. After their marriage, Joshua Prakash claimed to be Pari Vallal and told that his parents locked him in a room for 12 years. The villagers first cannot believe him, but his perfect recollections of Kodaikanal and its inhabitants baffle many. The psychiatrist Elangovan (Thalaivasal Vijay), Pari Vallal's brother, interviews Joshua Prakash and confirms that he is Pari Vallal. Annoyed by her husband's eccentric behavior, Mallika decides to leave the place, but Joshua Prakash confesses that he loves her and  wants to get ahold of the money hidden by Veeraiyyan. Chandrabose and his team track Joshua Prakash and abduct him in a cabin in the woods. They force him to show the place and then find Thennavan's corpse. Sara, armed with a rifle, threatens to kill them.

In 1988, Chandrabose, his squad, and Veeraiyyan were actually partners in crime. Chandrabose and his squad then double-crossed Veeraiyan and killed the minister. Veeraiyyan, who tried to escape, was shot in the back. An injured Veeraiyyan begged Pari Vallal to save him and told him the place where he had hidden the money, but Thennavan killed Pari Vallal and Veeraiyyan died from his injuries.

In 2008, Joshua Prakash reveals that he is not Pari Vallal's rebirth but the son of the minister who was killed by them. With Sara, he has planned to take revenge on Chandrabose and his squad. Joshua Prakash and Sara eventually kill them, and he then tells her to keep the money. The film ends with Joshua Prakash and Mallika adopting Kabini and leaving the village.

Cast

Anoop Kumar as Joshua Prakash
Meera Vasudevan as Sara
Poornitha as Mallika
Chandrabose as Chandrabose
Thalaivasal Vijay as Elangovan
Prem as Pari Vallal
Thennavan as Thennavan
Jayaprakasam as Jayaprakash 
Sakthivel as Sakthivel
Vinoth Kumar as Vinoth Kumar
W. Afsar Babu as Police Commissioner
Baby Prahasitha as Kabini
Kottai Perumal as Chinnadurai
Ayyappan Gopi as Church Father
R. Karthikeyan
Sathyandra
Rail Vijayakumar
Rathnaraj
Apeksha

Production

Director Dinesh Selvaraj, erstwhile assistant to Mani Ratnam and son of writer R. Selvaraj, made his directorial debut with Kathi Kappal. Actor Anoop Kumar, who did a small role in Vattaram and was a qualified dancer, was selected to play the hero alongside Meera Vasudevan and Poornitha. Music director Chandrabose played the role of a crooked cop whose role was also said to be significant. Dinesh Selvaraj mentioned that keeping the genre in mind, he shot a romantic song in a graveyard.

Soundtrack

The film score and the soundtrack were composed by Sree Sai. The soundtrack features 5 tracks with lyrics written by N. Annamalai. The audio was released on 12 April 2008 in Sathyam Cinemas in Chennai. Director Mani Rathnam released the first copy of the album that was received by director N. Lingusamy. Director Bharathiraja also attended the event.

Reception

Pavithra Srinivasan of Rediff.com rated the film 1.5 out of 5 and said, "It's a pretty short movie but the predominant feeling you get when everything's over is that it could all have gone much better". Behindwoods.com rate the film 0.5 out of 5 and wrote, "Entire cast performs very unnaturally and it is an uphill task for the audience to get involved in the film. Some of the scenes which are expected to be spooky turn out to be contrived and fall flat. Besides, it is also very difficult to tolerate the buffoonery in the climax sequence". A reviewer from Nowrunning.com rated the film 1.5 out of 5 and stated, "What sustains interest in the film are the scintillating background score by Sri Sai and Abdul Kalam's splendorous celluloid visuals of Kodaikanal". Another reviewer rated the film 1 out of 5 and wrote, "the film has failed in all ingredients and it will not be long before it will bite the dust".

References

2008 films
2000s Tamil-language films
Indian thriller films
Indian films about revenge
Films shot in Kodaikanal
2008 directorial debut films
2008 thriller films